The Centre for Human Reproductive Science (ChRS) was established in December 2006 to further develop research and innovation in fertility diagnosis and treatment, working in partnership as the academic and research wing of the Birmingham Women's Fertility Centre at Birmingham Women’s Hospital and the University of Birmingham Medical School. A particular emphasis in the biomedical research strategy is placing research and discovery in the true physiological context.

Current Research and Funding 
The current focus and funding of the Centre includes: 
 Translational medicine research funded by the National Institute for Health and Care Research (NIHR) on Andrology and male factors in healthy live birth 
 Research into the role for paternal sperm DNA damage in unexplained miscarriage, its diagnosis and treatment - as part of the Tommy's National Centre for Miscarriage Research 
 Research into advanced computer-assisted diagnosis of male fertility issues - funded by the EPSRC
 A clinical trial of how to select the best sperm for ICSI and the associated basic science of how it works - HABSelect 
 How engineering design and additive manufacture can be guided by human development processes - funded by the EPSRC

Research Advances 
The ChRS team alongside the Fertility Centre have made recent notable advances in various areas, these include achievements in:
Translational medicine, such as the invention of the male Fertell over-the-counter home fertility test.
The first detailed studies of ion channels in human sperm.
Detailed characterisation of the events occurring in sperm in response to steroid hormones, including the discovery of slow calcium oscillations, now thought to possibly regulate motility. To date the identity of the cell receptors involved has not been clearly elucidated.
Substantial follow-up data of children born through IVF treatment to check for increased risks associated with the treatment.
Research on the area of gametogenesis, this includes research derivation of gametes from embryonic stem cells by Dr Sarah Conner at the University of Birmingham and work to identify the genes that are expressed during normal and perturbed spermatogenesis.
Due to its interest in human embryonic stem cell research, the group and associated clinic was one of five selected around the UK to receive Medical Research Council funding to elevate the IVF laboratories to 'cleanroom' levels. This is fundamental for producing human embryonic stem cells that are suitable for human use, as all stages of development were in strictly controlled conditions. These opened in summer 2006 and the clinic has maintained good clinical results at the new operating levels (see HFEA).
ChRS also has psychology collaborations to actively pursue research enabling better understanding of patient feelings and care during fertility treatment; and issues surrounding motivation to be a donor and receipt of donor gametes.

Fertility Treatment & Diagnosis
The ChRS does not directly enter into patient treatment or diagnosis being focussed upon research. These are delivered through the affiliated  Birmingham Women's Fertility Centre at Birmingham Women’s Hospital.

Management
The current HFEA Person Responsible on the Research Licences and Research Lead is Jackson Kirkman-Brown MBE PhD.

References

External links
ChRS Website
Male Fertility Kit Invented in Birmingham  BBC news

Medical research institutes in the United Kingdom
Obstetrics and gynaecology organizations
Research institutes in the West Midlands (county)
Infertility